Riccas Corner is a census-designated place (CDP) in Sonoma County, California. The population is 38,986.

References

Sonoma County, California